Seohaeicola nanhaiensis is a Gram-negative, rod-shaped, aerobic and non-motile bacterium from the genus of Seohaeicola which has been isolated from sediments of the South China Sea.

References 

Rhodobacteraceae
Bacteria described in 2015